The Naples Invitational is a college basketball tournament that started in 2021 held on the campus of Community School of Naples in Naples, Florida. The Naples Invitational field also is limited strictly to mid-major programs. All are streamed on Flohoops.com.

Brackets 
* – Denotes overtime period

2021

External links
 Naples Invitational

References

College men's basketball competitions in the United States
College basketball competitions
2021 establishments in Florida
Basketball competitions in Florida
Recurring sporting events established in 2021
Sports in Naples, Florida